The National Arts Council of Zimbabwe (NACZ) is the official arts council for Zimbabwe. They award the annual National Arts Merit Awards (NAMA) in recognition of outstanding achievements in the arts and culture.

External links
 National Arts Council of Zimbabwe website

References

Arts councils
Arts organisations based in Zimbabwe